William Brocklehurst  may refer to:
William Brocklehurst (politician, born 1818) (1818–1900), businessman and Liberal Party politician from Macclesfield, MP 1868–1880 and 1885–1886
William Brocklehurst (politician, born 1851) (1851–1929), businessman and Liberal Party politician from Macclesfield, MP 1906–1918